The Minister of Justice and Correctional Services is the justice minister in the government of South Africa. He is the political head of the Department of Justice and Constitutional Development (DoJCD), the Department of Correctional Services (DCS), and the Office of the Chief Justice. DoJCD is responsible for administrative support to the courts, oversight of the National Prosecuting Authority, the provision of legal services to departments of state, and law reform; and DSC is responsible for prisons and community corrections programmes.

, the incumbent is Ronald Lamola, who was appointed to the position by President Cyril Ramaphosa in June 2019. His deputies are John Jeffery, who is responsible for the Justice portfolio, and Inkosi Patekile Holomisa, who is responsible for Correctional Services.

History of the portfolio 
Correctional services was a part of the Justice portfolio until 1990, when extensive prison reforms were announced and a separate department and ministerial portfolio were established. The Justice portfolio became Justice and Constitutional Development in 1999, at the beginning of the second Mbeki cabinet, when constitutional matters were detached from the Ministry of Provincial Affairs and Constitutional Development – which had itself previously been the Ministry of Constitutional Development, until a reorganisation under the Mandela cabinet of 1994 to 1999. In July 2014, at the beginning of the second Zuma cabinet, the portfolios were merged again, creating the Ministry of Justice and Correctional Services. However, the Department of Correctional Services remains distinct from the Department of Justice and Constitutional Development; although they share a political head or executive authority, they are operationally and legislatively distinct. They report to the same parliamentary body, the Portfolio Committee on Justice and Correctional Services, but separately.

Three prime ministers have been Minister of Justice, including two – Jan Smuts and B. J. Vorster – who held the position directly before being elected prime minister. In 2004, Brigitte Mabandla became the first woman to be appointed to the portfolio.

List of Ministers

Ministry of Justice (1910–1999)

Ministry of Justice and Constitutional Development (1999–2014)

Ministry of Justice and Correctional Services (2014–present)

Institutions overseen by the Ministry
The following institutions are housed in the Justice and Correctional Services portfolio, although most have a significant degree of operational and statutory independence:

 Department of Justice and Constitutional Development
 Department of Correctional Services
 Office of the Chief Justice
 Public Protector
 National Prosecuting Authority
 Judicial Inspectorate for Correctional Services
 Legal Aid South Africa
 South African Human Rights Commission
 Electoral Commission
 Judicial Service Commission

References

Justice
South Africa